Bikram Yoga is a system of hot yoga, a type of yoga as exercise, devised by Bikram Choudhury and based on the teachings of B. C. Ghosh, that became popular in the early 1970s. The room is fitted with carpets and the walls are covered in mirrors. The instructor may adjust the students' yoga postures. Choudhury's teaching style was abrasive. 

Bikram Yoga spread rapidly across America and the Western world, reaching a peak of some 1,650 studios in at least 40 countries in 2006. Choudhury attempted to copyright the Bikram Yoga sequence from 2011, but was ultimately unsuccessful. In 2016, facing lawsuits and accusations of sexual assault, Choudhury fled to India, leaving Bikram Yoga, Inc. to be run by others.

Origins

Bikram Choudhury was born in Calcutta in 1944. He began studying yoga in 1969. He arrived in America in 1971, and soon began to teach yoga in health resorts in California. In 1974, two pupils, Shirley MacLaine and Anne Marie Bennstrom, helped him to open his own school at 9441 Wilshire Boulevard in Los Angeles. He attracted celebrity pupils including the Hollywood dancer Marge Champion and the actors Keir Dullea, Martin Sheen, Susan Sarandon, and Raquel Welch. Yoga classes were initially free, with a donation box. Maclaine told Choudhury he could not run an American yoga school like one in India, and he began to charge $5 for classes; attendance started to grow at once.

Choudhury later devised the 26-posture sequence of Bikram Yoga, based on the teachings of B. C. Ghosh.

Style

Bikram Yoga Beginning Series classes run for 90 minutes and always consist of 26 postures, namely a fixed sequence of 24 asanas and two pranayama (breathing exercise). It starts with a standing pranayama, followed by a standing sequence of asanas, a first savasana, floor asanas the last pranayama named Kapalabhati which is a shatkarma (a purification)  and a final savasana that ends the sequence. The sequence starts with a standing pranayama breathing exercise  The room is fitted with mirrors and carpets; the yoga postures of students may be adjusted by the teacher, who can also adjust themselves using the mirrors.

Bikram Yoga trains its own teachers. They are taught a standardized dialogue to run the class, but are encouraged to develop their own delivery style.

The author Brigid Delaney described seeing Choudhury in his first yoga studio in Australia, and was "shocked" by the environment and by Choudhury's bragging and abrasive manner; she noted also the docility of his students and the "fawning" atmosphere, writing:

Growth

Choudhury was extremely charismatic and persuasive, contributing to his success, according to principal Bikram teacher Emmy Cleaves; he also had a philosophy of making pupils work through pain, and a "highly entertaining in-class patter", being happy to tell pupils "I am a butcher and I try to kill you ... but don't worry, yoga is the best death". By 1984, classes were priced at $20 (about $50 in 2019 terms). That year, sports journalist Jack McCallum watched a class respond to Choudhury's verbal abuse "like eager cadets". Practice was so intense that it demanded "an entire identity", based on commitment to hard work, a regular yoga schedule, and verbal castigation, in short "a complete religion of bodily purification", rewarded by "a feeling of pure energy". The franchise grew rapidly and spread to other countries; by 2006, there were 1,650 Bikram Yoga studios around the world. The franchise then declined somewhat; by 2012, there were 330 studios in the United States and 600 worldwide. In Africa, there were studios in Morocco and South Africa; in the Americas, Argentina, Brazil, Chile, Colombia, Mexico, 39 U.S. states, and Canada; in Asia, China, India, Indonesia, Israel, Japan, Malaysia, Philippines, Singapore, South Korea, Thailand, and the UAE; in Europe, Austria, Belgium, Czech Republic, Denmark, Finland, France, Germany, Hungary, Ireland, Italy, Latvia, Netherlands, Norway, Russia, Spain, Sweden, Turkey, and the United Kingdom; and Australia and New Zealand.

Health effects

A 2013 review of 76 yoga-related adverse events included 3 in Bikram Yoga. The three case reports consisted of one case of rosacea, one psychotic episode, and one of hyponatremia (low salt level).

A systematic review in 2015 found that Bikram Yoga improved lower body strength, range of joint motion in both upper and lower body, and balance. It noted that unsystematic trials (without randomized controls) had found possible improvements in glucose tolerance, bone density, blood lipids, artery stiffness, mindfulness, and "perceived stress". It recommended that future research should follow guidelines to provide reliable results.

Copyright claims

Choudhury claimed, starting in 2011, that Bikram Yoga was under copyright and that it could not be taught or presented by anyone whom he had not authorized. In that year, Choudhury started a lawsuit against Yoga to the People, a competing yoga studio founded by a former student of Choudhury's and with a location near one of the Bikram Yoga studios in New York, and later started another against the Florida-based Evolation Yoga. Choudhury lost at first instance in both cases and appealed the decision, but the Court of Appeal ultimately dismissed his copyright claim over yoga poses in Bikram Yoga.

As a result of that lawsuit, the United States Copyright Office issued a clarification that yoga postures (asanas) could not be copyrighted in the way claimed by Choudhury, and that Yoga to the People and others could continue to freely teach these exercises.

Sexual abuse by Choudhury

Choudhury has faced multiple lawsuits alleging sexual harassment, assault, racism and homophobia. In 2016 he fled to India, where he continued to teach yoga. His former lawyer, Minakshi Jafa-Bodden, took over the running of Bikram, Inc. in America, after she successfully sued Choudhury for $7M in damages and he fled the country to avoid payment. 

The accusations against Choudhury were the subject of a 2019 Netflix true crime documentary, Bikram: Yogi, Guru, Predator. The documentary also gave an exploration of Choudhury's early life in India, mostly told by Choudhury himself, in juxtaposition with the allegations and testimonies of various women who claim to have been assaulted and bullied by him. They argue that Choudbury was a charismatic but abusive and rude narcissist who took pleasure in mocking the physical appearances of his students, while holding financial and emotional power over many of them. Bikram: Yogi, Guru, Predator has since been challenged by Choudhury's lawyer.

References 

Yoga styles
Yoga schools
Companies based in Los Angeles
Exercise-related trademarks